Dong Guanping (born in ; sometimes Dong Guangping) is a Chinese human rights activist who was disappeared in 2022 in Vietnam.

Early life 
Guanping was born in China in 1958 or 1959 to a father who was a military general. He grew up in a wealthy family and his brothers joined the armed and became colonels.

Career 
Guanping worked as a police inspector and a soldier before becoming a human-rights activist. He was fired from the police force in 1999 for signing a letter about the 1989 Tiananmen Square protests and massacre, before being jailed for three years. He is known in China for speaking out against China's censorship of news about the Tiananmen Square protests and massacre. Guanping was taken from a Thai immigration centre by Chinese police in 2015 while he was attempting to resettle to Canada. The police returned him to China where he was jailed for three years.

He fled China for Vietnam in 2020. Guanping was arrested in Hanoi by Vietnamese authorities August 22, 2022. Canada offered him political asylum. As of mid February 2023, the Vietnam government had declined to release any information about his whereabouts.

Personal life 
Guanping's daughter Katherine Dong and family live in Canada, where they relocated in 2015. Guanping was aged 64 in February 2023.

See also 

 Enforced disappearance
 China–Vietnam relations

References 

1950s births
Living people
Chinese emigrants to Vietnam
Chinese human rights activists
Chinese military personnel
Chinese police officers